The Steelton-Highspire School District is a diminutive, urban public school district located in Dauphin County, Pennsylvania. It encompasses the boroughs of Steelton and Highspire, both industrial suburbs of the City of Harrisburg. According to 2005 local census data, it served a resident population of 9,417. By 2010, the district's population declined to 8,393 people. The educational attainment levels for the Steelton-Highspire School District population (25 years old and over) were 89% high school graduates and 11% college graduates.

According to the Pennsylvania Budget and Policy Center, 74.8% of the district's pupils lived at 185% or below the Federal Poverty level as shown by their eligibility for the federal free or reduced price school meal programs in 2012. In 2009, Steelton-Highspire School District residents' per capita income was $17,304, while the median family income was $39,956. In the Commonwealth, the median family income was $49,501 and the United States median family income was $49,445, in 2010. In Dauphin County, the median household income was $52,371. By 2013, the median household income in the United States rose to $52,100.

The district operates Steelton-Highspire Elementary School, and one combined middle school with one high school.

Extracurriculars
The district offers a variety of clubs, activities and sports.

Sports
The district funds:

Boys
Baseball - A
Basketball - AAA
Football - A
Track and field - AA

Girls
Basketball - A
Softball - A
Track and field - AA
Volleyball - A

Junior high school sports

Boys
Basketball
Football
Track and field

Girls
Basketball
Track and field
Volleyball 

According to PIAA directory July 2015

References

School districts in Dauphin County, Pennsylvania
Education in Harrisburg, Pennsylvania